HFX Wanderers Football Club, commonly known as HFX Wanderers, and spoken as Halifax Wanderers, is a Canadian professional soccer club in Halifax, Nova Scotia. The club competes in the Canadian Premier League at the top of the Canadian soccer league system, and play their home matches at Wanderers Grounds.

History

In December 2016, Sports & Entertainment Atlantic owner Derek Martin met with Canadian Premier League officials to discuss launching a franchise in Halifax. Martin pitched the idea of a pop-up stadium to Halifax City Councillors in March 2017, and approval was given three months later. On May 5, 2018, Halifax was one of four groups accepted by the Canadian Soccer Association for professional club membership.

HFX Wanderers FC was officially unveiled on May 25, 2018, as the third team to join the Canadian Premier League. As well as confirming their place in the league for the 2019 launch season, the club also revealed their crest, colours and branding.

On July 28, 2018, HFX Wanderers FC fielded an Atlantic Selects team to play a friendly against Fortuna Düsseldorf's under-21 squad at Wanderers Grounds. The Atlantic Selects won on penalties after a 2–2 score in regulation time. The official attendance was 4,809.

They played their first league game on April 28, 2019, in 1–0 away loss to Pacific FC.

Stadium 

The club plays their home games at Wanderers Grounds. The modular stadium opened with a capacity of 6,500 spectators. The stadium's design allows for it to be expanded as required for future growth.

Crest and colours
The shape of the crest takes inspiration from the Halifax Citadel, located near the club's stadium. The crest includes the Angus L. Macdonald Bridge, which connects the Halifax Peninsula with Dartmouth, and an anchor to represent the Atlantic Ocean and Halifax Harbour.

Underneath the club's name reads the Scottish Gaelic motto, Ar Cala, Ar Dachaigh, Ar n-Anam, which translates to Our Harbour, Our Home, Our Soul. Scottish Gaelic is used to signify that Nova Scotia is one of the few places remaining where the language is still spoken.

The crest was created by Canadian graphic designer Mark Guilherme based on consultation and feedback from meetings with supporters, Halifax city leaders and local residents.

The official club colours are navy, grey, and cyan (branded by the club as "harbour blue," "naval grey," and "aqua ocean"). These colours symbolize the night sky, the Royal Canadian Navy, and the Atlantic Ocean.

Club culture 
The Wanderers are one of the most popular CPL teams, with great support within Halifax. The team recurrently tops the attendance charts, with frequent sellouts at the Wanderers Grounds. In 2021, the average attendance was 5,196 spectators.

Supporters 

The first supporters group to lobby for a Halifax team to join the Canadian Premier League was founded in September 2016 under the name Wanderers SG. At the launch event to unveil HFX Wanderers' identity, supporters announced they were changing their name to Privateers 1882 in order for the club to continue the Wanderers name. The 1882 signifies the year of formation for the Wanderers Amateur Athletic Club, who previously competed at the Wanderers Grounds. 'Privateers' refers to the history of privateering in the region, as well as the popular regional song Barrett's Privateers.

Honours
 Canadian Premier League
Runners-up: 2020

Players and staff

Roster 

Where a player has not declared an international allegiance, nation is determined by place of birth.

Out on loan

Current staff

Head coaches

Club captains

Record

Year-by-year 

1. Average attendance include statistics from league matches only.
2. Top goalscorer(s) includes all goals scored in league season, league playoffs, Canadian Championship, CONCACAF League, and other competitive continental matches.

See also 

 Canadian Championship
 Nova Scotia Clippers

References

External links

 
Association football clubs established in 2018
Canadian Premier League teams
Sport in Halifax, Nova Scotia
Soccer clubs in Nova Scotia
2018 establishments in Nova Scotia